Batterstown is a small rural village in the townland of Rathregan (Ráth Riagáin), County Meath, Ireland. It hosts a yearly cycling race. There are approximately forty houses in Batterstown. The population of Batterstown is approximately 150 people.

Facilities
A primary school (Rathregan National School) is in Batterstown. The post office was closed in 2018.

Sport
The local Batterstown Gaelic Athletic Association club is Blackhall Gaels GAA. Batterstown holds the club's main training ground. The club fields Gaelic football, Ladies' Gaelic football, hurling and camogie teams.

Transport
Batterstown railway station on the Dublin–Navan railway line opened on 1 July 1863, was closed for passenger traffic on 27 January 1947, closed for goods traffic on 12 June 1961, and finally closed altogether on 1 April 1963. The village is served by the Bus Éireann 111 Athboy to Dublin service. Under the Bus Éireann M3 Corridor - Bus Services to Dublin & Local Centres Proposals announced in 2015, this route has enhanced services with hourly service off peak and more frequent during the morning rush hours.

See also
 List of towns and villages in Ireland
 Kilcloon
 Mulhussey

References

Towns and villages in County Meath